Dennis Kaars (born 7 June 1988) is a Dutch football player. He plays for VV HBOK.

Club career
He made his Eerste Divisie debut for FC Den Bosch on 18 August 2017 in a game against Jong AZ.

References

External links
 

1988 births
People from Purmerend
Living people
Dutch footballers
Association football forwards
VV Monnickendam players
AFC Ajax (amateurs) players
ASV De Dijk players
FC Den Bosch players
Quick Boys players
Eerste Divisie players
Tweede Divisie players
Derde Divisie players
Footballers from North Holland